From the Heart is the third album by saxophonist Hank Crawford, featuring performances recorded in 1961 and 1962 for the Atlantic label.

Reception

AllMusic awarded the album four stars, stating "From the Heart features Crawford digging deep into the Memphis tradition for expression. ...This is an early highpoint for Crawford."

Track listing
All compositions by Hank Crawford except as indicated
 "Don't Cry Baby" (Saul Bernie, James P. Johnson, Stella Unger) - 4:22
 "Sweet Cakes" - 3:40
 "You've Changed" (Bill Carey, Carl Fischer) - 3:20
 "Baby Let Me Hold Your Hand" (Ray Charles) - 3:53
 "Sherri" - 4:39
 "The Peeper" - 3:09
 "But on the Other Hand" (Percy Mayfield) - 5:03
 "Stoney Lonesome" - 5:43
 "What Will I Tell My Heart?" (Irving Gordon, Jack Lawrence, Peter Tinturin) - 5:09

Personnel 
Hank Crawford - alto saxophone, piano
Phil Guilbeau, John Hunt - trumpet
David Newman - tenor saxophone
Leroy Cooper - baritone saxophone
Sonny Forriest - guitar (tracks 1, 3, 5 & 6)
Edgar Willis - bass
Bruno Carr - drums

References 

1962 albums
Hank Crawford albums
Atlantic Records albums
Albums produced by Nesuhi Ertegun